Handan Sultan ("smiling";  1568 - 9 November 1605) was a consort of Ottoman Sultan Mehmed III, and mother and Valide Sultan to their son Sultan Ahmed I.

Early life
Of Greek origin, or more probraly Bosnian, her original name was Helen or Helena. Handan Sultan was a servant in the household of Cerrah Mehmed Pasha, the Beylerbey of the Rumelia Eyalet. He was the husband of Gevherhan Sultan, daughter of Sultan Selim II, sister of Sultan Murad III, and aunt of Sultan Mehmed III. Mehmed Pasha was a surgeon ("cerrah") and had circumcised Prince Mehmed in 1582.

As imperial consort
In 1583, when Mehmed was appointed the sancak-bey of Saruhan, Handan being beautiful was presented to him at his departure by Mehmed Pasha and Gevherhan Sultan. When Mehmed ascended the throne after his father's death in 1595, Handan came to Istanbul with him. She was allied with Safiye Sultan against Halime, Mehmed's second concubine and mother of two Sehzade, however she and Safiye didn't really like each other and Handan never was Haseki Sultan. Handan also had an ally in Raziye Hatun, who introduced her to Mehmed.

Issue
Together with Mehmed, Handan had at least six children, four sons and two daughters:

Sons 
Şehzade Selim (1585, Manisa Palace, Manisa – 1597/1598, Topkapı Palace, Istanbul, buried in Hagia Sophia Mosque);
Şehzade Süleyman (1586, Manisa Palace, Manisa – 1597/1598, Topkapı Palace, Istanbul, buried in Hagia Sophia Mosque);
Ahmed I (18 April 1590, Manisa Palace, Manisa – 22 November 1617, Topkapı Palace, Istanbul, buried in Ahmed I Mausoleum, Sultan Ahmed Mosque);
Sehzade Osman (1597, Istanbul - 1601, Istanbul), is said by Agostino Nani to have been full brother to Ahmed. However, Nani often confuses Ahmed with Mahmud, Halime's son and Ahmed's half-brother. Therefore, there is a possibility that Osman could be the son of the latter. It must be said, however, that Ahmed gave the name of each of his blood brothers to one of his sons, but none of his half-brothers, and that his firstborn was called Osman.

Daughters 
Fatma Sultan (1584?, Manisa Palace, Manisa - ?). She married the governor of Cairo, Mahmud Pasha, in the early 1600s. She married Tiryaki Hasan Pasha in 1604 and had a son and two daughters. When Hasan died in 1611, she married Güzelce Ali Pasha in 1616, until his death in 1621.
Ayşe Sultan (c. 1587? – After 1614), married firstly to Destari Mustafa Pasha, with whom she had a son and two daughters who died young. Some sources also suggest that she married Gazi Hüsrev Pasha

As Valide Sultan

Ahmed's accession
When Ahmed ascended the throne following Mehmed III's death on 22 December 1603, Handan became Valide Sultan. As the mother of the new Sultan, she received 1,000 aspers a day. On Friday 9 January, the former Valide Sultan Safiye Sultan, along with Şehzade Mustafa (future Mustafa I), were sent to live in the Eski (old) Palace located at the Beyazıt Square. Soon after his succession, Ahmed wanted to express his gratitude to Mehmed Pasha and Gevherhan Sultan for the role they had played in bringing his parents together. By then, however, Cerrah Mehmed Pasha was old and ailing, and died on 9 January 1604. Ahmed, therefore, honored the late pasha's wife. He also named one of his daughters after her.

As co-regent
As a co-regent, she immediately began building up her network of clients, and was actively involved in the running of dynastic and imperial affairs together with Ahmed's tutor Mustafa Efendi (died 1607 or 1608). Ahmed several times announced his eagerness to go to war. It seems that Handan Sultan and Mustafa Efendi advised him to behave in this manner in order to give the public the impression that he was capable of ruling the state. He also began to spend a great deal of time outside the palace, notably hunting or conducting incognito inspections, regardless of the weather. Handan Sultan quickly realized that her son could easily put himself in danger and thus needed to be closely watched.

She favored her fellow Bosnians at her son's court. She convinced Ahmed to appoint Yavuz Ali Pasha as grand vizier, and maintained a close relationship with him, especially during the first critical months of Ahmed's reign. In spring of 1604, she and Mustafa Efendi ordered Ali Pasha to take command in Hungary. In August 1604, Ahmed ordered the execution of deputy grand vizier Kasim Pasha, and in January 1605 of his successor Sarıkçı Mustafa Pasha, and in both cases his decision was approved and encouraged by Handan Sultan and Mustafa Efendi, who were trying to rid the court of clients of Safiye Sultan.

Because of Handan Sultan's influence on her son, Dervish Mehmed Agha replaced Bayran Agha as chief gardener in summer of 1604. Whenever Handan, Ahmed, and Derviş gathered in the palace gardens, she made Ahmed promise that he will not do anything contrary to Derviş's words and thoughts. Thanks to Handan's continuous support, he managed to become the first royal favorite of Ahmed.

Handan Sultan also acted as an intermediary between her son and other government officials. Any vizier who wanted to communicate with Ahmed had to submit his petition first to her. The contemporary historian Ibrahim Peçevi questioned her wisdom, but legitimized her authority over her son by an old and popular saying "a mother's right is God's right".

Charities
Handan Sultan made an endowment for the maintenance of her husband Mehmed III's tomb and the salaries of its employees. She also made endowments in Kütahya, Menemen and Kilizman.

Illness
Sinanpaşaoğlu Mehmed Pasha, who had been married to Piyale Pasha and Gevherhan Sultan's daughter Hatice Hanımsultan in November 1598, was sent to quell the Jelali rebellions in Anatolia. However, he proved to be ineffective, and conducted himself so inappropriately as to arouse suspicions that he had turned a rebel himself. With Handan's intervention, he was forgiven by the sultan. He returned to Istanbul, and took up his duties as vezir. However, he was executed on 20 August 1605. Handan, who was already ill at that time, was so shocked by the turn of events that her condition reportedly worsened.

Death and aftermath
Handan Sultan died at the Topkapı Palace on Wednesday, 9 November 1605 after a long illness. At her funeral, large amounts of food and alms were distributed for the sake of her soul. She was buried next to her consort in his mausoleum in Hagia Sophia Mosque, Istanbul. Ahmed despite appeals of the viziers for the customary mourning for seven days, didn't postpone his departure from Istanbul on campaign against the Jelali revolts. After Handan's death, Kosem Sultan took control of the harem throughout Ahmed's reign, and became the highest authority in the harem.

In popular culture
In the 2015 TV series Muhteşem Yüzyıl: Kösem, Handan Sultan is portrayed by Turkish actress Tülin Özen.

See also
Ottoman dynasty
Ottoman family tree
List of Valide Sultans
List of consorts of the Ottoman Sultans

References

Sources
 
 
 
 
 
 
 
 
 
  (unpublished PhD thesis)
 
 

1605 deaths
Valide sultan
16th-century Bosnian people
17th-century Bosnian people
People from the Ottoman Empire of Bosnian descent
Slaves from the Ottoman Empire
16th-century consorts of Ottoman sultans
17th-century consorts of Ottoman sultans
Concubines of the Ottoman Empire
Turkish people of Bosniak descent
1569 births
16th-century slaves